Harry Thompson (29 April 1915 – 29 January 2000) was an English professional footballer who played  for Mansfield Town, Wolves and Sunderland. He later became the first professional manager of Oxford United.

Playing career
Born in Mansfield in 1915, Harry played for his local side Mansfield Town before joining Wolves. Later in his career, he signed for Sunderland for £7,500. After making 14 appearances for the Black Cats, including an FA Cup semi-final, Thompson retired from football.

Oxford United
In 1949 Thompson was signed as Oxford United manager. He managed the club for 9 years, winning the Southern League and the Southern League Cup twice. They also reached the fourth round of the FA Cup.

Honours
Oxford United
Southern League champions: (1953)
Southern League Cup winners: (1953 and 1954)

References

1915 births
2000 deaths
Footballers from Mansfield
English footballers
Sunderland A.F.C. players
Mansfield Town F.C. players
Wolverhampton Wanderers F.C. players
Oxford United F.C. managers
Brentford F.C. wartime guest players
Association footballers not categorized by position
English football managers